Charles Yeung Chun-kam, GBS, JP (born February 1947 in Huiyang, China) is a Hong Kong entrepreneur and politician. A Hakka, Yeung was a member of the Provisional Legislative Council which existed from 1996 to 1998 and councillor and the member of the Chinese People's Political Consultative Conference National Committee. He was the advisory professor of the China Textile University, director of the Seng Heng Bank and adviser of the One Country Two Systems Research Institute.

Yeung is the founder and chairman of Glorious Sun Enterprises Limited, a company listed on the Hong Kong Stock Exchange.

Yeung is the real estate developer of One Peking, a landmark skyscraper located at the cross-section of Peking Road and Canton Road in Tsim Sha Tsui, Kowloon, Hong Kong, across the street from Harbour City. Yeung acquired the site from the Hong Kong Government in auction in 1998 for HK$1.24 billion and invested more than $2 billion in developing the site.

Yeung is chairman of the Chinese General Chamber of Commerce.

References

1947 births
Living people
Members of the Provisional Legislative Council
Hong Kong Progressive Alliance politicians
Hong Kong chief executives
Members of the National Committee of the Chinese People's Political Consultative Conference
Hong Kong people of Hakka descent
People from Huiyang
Recipients of the Silver Bauhinia Star
Recipients of the Gold Bauhinia Star
Members of the Selection Committee of Hong Kong
Businesspeople from Guangdong
Members of the Election Committee of Hong Kong, 2021–2026